Rock 'n' Wrestling may refer to:
1980s professional wrestling boom, a surge in popularity of American professional wrestling
Hulk Hogan's Rock 'n' Wrestling, an American animated television series